Bijapur North Lok Sabha constituency was a former Lok Sabha constituency in Karnataka (Bombay State from 1952 to 1956).  This seat came into existence in 1951. Before 1967 Lok Sabha Elections, it ceased to exist.

Assembly segments
Bijapur North Lok Sabha constituency comprised the following six Legislative Assembly segments:
Bijapur
Indi Sindgi (2 Seats)
Hippargi Bagewadi
Managoli Bableswar
Jath
Muddebihal

After Bijapur district of erstwhile Bombay State got merged with Mysore State in 1956, this seat became a part of Mysore State and before 1967 Lok Sabha Elections, it ceased to exist and was replaced by Bijapur Lok Sabha constituency.

Members of Parliament 
Bombay State:
1951: Rajaram Girdharilal Dubey, Indian National Congress

Mysore State:
1957: Sugandhi Murigappa Siddappa, Indian National Congress
1962: Rajaram Girdharilal Dubey, Indian National Congress
1967 onwards:
Bijapur Lok Sabha constituency

See also
 Bijapur South Lok Sabha constituency
 Bijapur Lok Sabha constituency
 Bagalkot Lok Sabha constituency
 Bijapur district
 Bagalkot district
 List of former constituencies of the Lok Sabha

Notes

Bijapur district, Karnataka
Bagalkot district
Former constituencies of the Lok Sabha
1967 disestablishments in India
Constituencies disestablished in 1967
Former Lok Sabha constituencies of Karnataka